is a Brazilian-born Japanese football player. He obtained Japanese citizenship in August 2003 and promptly changed his given name from Ricardo to the more "Japanized" pronunciation Rikarudo.

Football career
Higa was born in Campinas, Brazil on May 4, 1973. He played for some Brazilian club until the middle of 1990s. In 1997, he moved to Japan and joined Prefectural Leagues club Yaita SC in 1998. In 1999, he moved to newly was promoted to J2 League club, Albirex Niigata. In 2000, he moved to Prefectural Leagues club Okinawa Kariyushi FC and played in 1 season. In 2003, he joined Prefectural Leagues club FC Ryukyu. The club was promoted to Regional Leagues from 2005 and Japan Football League from 2006. He retired end of 2006 season.

Futsal career
Higa obtained Japanese citizenship in August 2003. In 2003, he was selected Japan national futsal team. He played at 2004 and 2008 Futsal World Cup.

Beach soccer career
In 2009, Higa was selected Japan national beach soccer team for 2009 Beach Soccer World Cup.

Club statistics

References

External links

futsal.jfa.or.jp

1973 births
Living people
Brazilian footballers
Japanese footballers
Japanese men's futsal players
J2 League players
Albirex Niigata players
FC Ryukyu players
Naturalized citizens of Japan
Brazilian emigrants to Japan
Brazilian people of Japanese descent
Association football midfielders
Japanese futsal coaches
Sportspeople from Campinas